Cäsar Rüstow (18 June 1826 – 4 July 1866) was a Prussian soldier and military writer.

The brother of Wilhelm Rüstow and Alexander Rüstow, Cäsar Rüstow was one of the foremost experts of his time in the design and construction of military rifles, and the writer of several treatises on that subject, notably Die Kriegshandfeuerwaffen (Berlin, 1857–64). Both Alexander and Cäsar fell on the field of battle in the war of 1866, Cäsar at the Battle of Dermbach. He was the grandfather of the sociologist Alexander Rüstow.

Works 
 Leitfaden der Waffenlehre, Erfurt, 1855, New Edition: Sommer, Anton; 2006 
 Das Miniegewehr, Erfurt, 1855
 Die Kriegshandfeuerwaffen Berlin 1857–1864, 2 Vol.
 Rückblicke auf Preußens Gewehränderung nach Minieschem System, Erfurt, 1857
 Die neueren gezogenen Infanteriegewehre: Ihre wahre Leistungsfähigkeit und die Mittel, dieselbe zu sichern. 2nd edition, Verlag Zernin, Darmstadt, 1862

1826 births
1866 deaths
People from Brandenburg an der Havel
German military writers
Prussian Army personnel
People from the Province of Brandenburg
German military personnel killed in action
Prussian people of the Austro-Prussian War
German male non-fiction writers
Military personnel from Brandenburg